The Kearsarge at Boulogne is an oil-on-canvas painting by Édouard Manet completed in 1864. It depicts the Union sloop-of-war  anchored at the French resort of Boulogne-sur-Mer.  

On June 19, 1864, the Kearsarge sank the Confederate raider  CSS Alabama at the Battle of Cherbourg in one of the most celebrated naval actions of the American Civil War. Many spectators were able to see the battle from the coast of France. Manet was inspired to make a painting of the battle, but not having witnessed it himself, relied on press descriptions to make an imaginary scene of the battle. and within 26 days of the event, he had already completed this painting and placed on display in the print shop of Alfred Cadart in Paris. This is the work known as The Battle of the Kearsarge and the Alabama, now at the Philadelphia Museum of Art. Several weeks later, Kearsarge made a port call at Boulogne-sur-Mer, where it drew wide media attention and numerous curious spectators, one of whom was Manet.

Manet painted a watercolor of the ship anchored at Boulogne-sur-Mer, which is now at the Musée des Beaux-Arts de Dijon, and later completed this oil-on-canvas painting. The painting is owned by the Metropolitan Museum of Art.

References

External links
Juliet Wilson-Bareau with David C. Degener, Manet and the American Civil War: The Battle of the U.S.S. Kearsarge and the C.S.S. Alabama, Issued in connection with an exhibition held June 3 - August 17, 2003, Metropolitan Museum of Art, New York

Paintings by Édouard Manet
1864 paintings
Paintings in the collection of the Metropolitan Museum of Art
Maritime paintings